Michael Baker (born January 8, 1970) is a former American football offensive specialist who played seven seasons in the Arena Football League with the St. Louis Stampede, Albany Firebirds and Grand Rapids Rampage. He played college football at West Virginia University. He was also a member of the London Monarchs of the World League of American Football.

References

External links
Just Sports Stats
College stats

Living people
1970 births
Players of American football from Georgia (U.S. state)
American football wide receivers
American football linebackers
African-American players of American football
West Virginia Mountaineers football players
London Monarchs players
St. Louis Stampede players
Albany Firebirds players
Grand Rapids Rampage players
People from Camden County, Georgia
21st-century African-American sportspeople
20th-century African-American sportspeople